Mahābhūta is Sanskrit and Pāli for "great element". However, very few scholars define the four mahābhūtas in a broader sense as the four fundamental aspects of physical reality.

Hinduism

In Hinduism's sacred literature, the "great" or "gross" elements (mahābhūta) are fivefold: space (or "ether"), air, fire, water and earth. See also the Samkhya Karika of Ishvara Krishna, verse 22.

For instance, the  describes the five "sheaths" of a person (Sanskrit: purua), starting with the grossest level of the five evolving great elements:
From this very self (tman) did space come into being; from space, air; from air, fire; from fire, the waters, from the waters, the earth; from the earth, plants; from plants, food; and from food, man.... Different from and lying within this man formed from the essence of food is the self (tman) consisting of lifebreath....  Different from and lying within this self consisting of breath is the self (tman) consisting of mind.... Different from and lying within this self consisting of mind is the self (tman) consisting of perception.... Different from and lying within this self consisting of perception is the self (tman) consisting of bliss....

Some wise men say it is inherent nature, while others say it is time – all totally deluded.  It is rather the greatness of God present in the world by means of which this wheel of brahman goes around.  Who always encompasses this whole world – the knower, the architect of time, the one without qualities, and the all-knowing one – it is at his command that the work of creation, to be conceived of as earth, water, fire, air, and space, unfolds itself.

The same Upanishad also mentions, "When earth, water fire, air and akasa arise, when the five attributes of the elements, mentioned in the books on yoga, become manifest then the yogi's body becomes purified by the fire of yoga and he is free from illness, old age and death." (Verse 2.12).

Buddhism
In Buddhism, the four Great Elements (Pali: cattāro mahābhūtāni) are earth, water, fire and air.  Mahābhūta is generally synonymous with catudhātu, which is Pāli for the "Four Elements." In early Buddhism, the Four Elements are a basis for understanding that leads one through unbinding of 'Rupa' or materiality to the supreme state of pure 'Emptiness' or Nirvana.

Definitions

In the Pali canon, the most basic elements are usually identified as four in number but, on occasion, a fifth and, to an even lesser extent, a sixth element may also be identified.

Four primary elements

In canonical texts, the four Great Elements refer to elements that are both "external" (that is, outside the body, such as a river) and "internal" (that is, of the body, such as blood).  These elements are described as follows:

Earth element (pruhavī-dhātu)Earth element represents the quality of solidity or attractive forces. Any matter where attractive forces are in prominence (solid bodies) are called earth elements. Internal earth elements include head hair, body hair, nails, teeth, skin, flesh, sinews, bone, organs, intestinal material, etc.
Water element (āpa-dhātu)Water element represents the quality of liquidity or relative motion. Any matter where relative motion of particles is in prominence are called water elements. Internal water elements include bile, phlegm, pus, blood, sweat, fat, tears, nasal mucus, urine, semen, etc.
Fire element (teja-dhātu)Fire element represents the quality of heat or energy. Any matter where energy is in prominence are called fire elements. Internal fire elements include those bodily mechanisms that produce physical warmth, ageing, digestion, etc.
Air (or wind) element (vāyu-dhātu)Air element represents the quality of expansion or repulsive forces. Any matter where repulsive forces are in prominence are called air elements. Internal air elements includes air associated with the pulmonary system (for example, for breathing), the intestinal system ("winds in the belly and bowels"), etc.

Any entity that carry one or more of these qualities (attractive forces, repulsive forces, energy and relative motion) are called matter (rupa). The material world is considered to be nothing but a combination of these qualities arranged in space (akasa). The result of these qualities are the inputs to our five senses, color (varna) to the eyes, smell (gandha) to the nose, taste (rasa) to the tongue, sound ('shabda') to the ears, and touch, to the body. The matter that we perceive in our mind are just a mental interpretation of these qualities.

Fifth and sixth elements

In addition to the above four elements of underived matter, two other elements are occasionally found in the Pali Canon:

Space element (ākāsa-dhātu)Internal space elements includes bodily orifices such as the ears, nostrils, mouth, anus, etc.

Consciousness element (viññāa-dhātu)Described as "pure and bright" (parisuddha pariyodāta), used to cognise the three feelings (vedana) of pleasure, pain and neither-pleasure-nor-pain, and the arising and passing of the sense contact (phassa) upon which these feelings are dependent.

According to the Abhidhamma Pitaka, the "space element" is identified as "secondary" or "derived" (upādā).

Sensory qualities, not substances

While in the Theravada tradition, as well as in the earliest texts, like the Pali Canon, rūpa (matter or form) is delineated as something external, that actually exists, in some of the later schools, like the Yogacara, or "Mind Only" school, and schools heavily influenced by this school, rupa means both materiality and sensibility—it signifies, for example, a tactile object both insofar as that object is tactile and that it can be sensed. In some of these schools, rūpa is not a materiality which can be separated or isolated from cognizance; such a non-empirical category is incongruous in the context of some schools of Mahayana and Vajrayana Buddhism. In the Yogacara view, rūpa is not a substratum or substance which has sensibility as a property. For this school, it functions as perceivable physicality and matter, or rūpa, is defined in its function; what it does, not what it is. As such, the four great elements are conceptual abstractions drawn from the sensorium. They are sensorial typologies, and are not metaphysically materialistic. From this perspective, they are not meant to give an account of matter as constitutive of external, mind-independent reality. This interpretation was hotly contested by some Madhyamaka thinkers like Chandrakirti.

As Four Fundamental Aspects, Not Rigidly Four Elements 

Very few scholars of (virtual) meta-analysis (of Theravada Buddhism and science) adopt a broader view of the rest of Buddha's concepts about the four mahābhūtas, which leads to an idea that they should not be rigidly translated to earth or solid, water or liquid, air or gas, and fire or plasma. Such speculation considers them as fundamental aspects of any physical object, definitely not very parts of a touchable object.
 Pathavī-dhātu should be density of any fundamental piece of mass; as soon as a mass exists in reality, it does take up a volume in space, and this is one of the four fundamental aspects. Although earth could have been mentioned by Buddha as the best example of this nature, any solid or liquid or gas would possess its own extent of this nature.
 Apo-dhātu or āpa-dhātu should be the combined nature of fluidity or viscosity, solubility and perhaps a few other similar features of any fundamental piece of mass. Although water could have been mentioned by Buddha as the best example of this nature, any solid or liquid or gas would possess its own extent of this nature.
 Vāyo-dhātu or vāyu-dhātu should be the nature of reactant force or pressure of any fundamental piece of object. This manifests itself in Newton's third law of motion and Pascal's law. Although air could have been mentioned by Buddha as the best example of this nature, any solid or liquid or gas would possess its own extent of this nature.
 Tejo-dhātu or teja-dhātu should simply be heat energy. Although some Buddhist texts contain two types of tejo: fire of heat and fire of (sheer) coldness, we nowadays understand that coldness is mere our interpretation of feeling something with less heat energy than the subject, any particle being scientifically not possible to have absolute zero of heat.

Soteriological uses

The Four Elements are used in Buddhist texts to both elucidate the concept of suffering (dukkha) and as an object of meditation. The earliest Buddhist texts explain that the four primary material elements are the sensory qualities solidity, fluidity, temperature, and mobility; their characterisation as earth, water, fire, and air, respectively, is declared an abstraction – instead of concentrating on the fact of material existence, one observes how a physical thing is sensed, felt, perceived.

Understanding suffering

The Four Elements pertinence to the Buddhist notion of suffering comes about due to:

 The Four Elements are the primary component of "form" (rūpa).

 "Form" is first category of the "Five Aggregates" (khandhas).

 The Five Aggregates are the ultimate basis for suffering (dukkha) in the "Four Noble Truths."

Schematically, this can be represented in reverse order as:

Four Noble Truths → Suffering → Aggregates → Form → Four Elements

Thus, to deeply understand the Buddha's Four Noble Truths, it is beneficial to have an understanding of the Great Elements.

Meditation object

In the Mahasatipatthana Sutta ("The Greater Discourse on the Foundations of Mindfulness," DN 22), in listing various bodily meditation techniques, the Buddha instructs:

"...Just as if a skilled butcher or his assistant, having slaughtered a cow, were to sit at a crossroads with the carcass divided into portions, so a monk reviews this very body ... in terms of the elements: 'There are in this body the earth-element, the water-element, the fire-element, the air-element.' So he abides contemplating body in body internally...."

In the Visuddhimagga's well-known list of forty meditation objects (kammahāna), the great elements are listed as the first four objects.

B. Alan Wallace compares the Theravada meditative practice of "attending to the emblem of consciousness" to the practice in Mahamudra and Dzogchen of "maintaining the mind upon non-conceptuality", which is also aimed at focusing on the nature of consciousness.

Buddhist sources

In the Pali canon, the Four Elements are described in detail in the following discourses (sutta):
 Mahahatthipadompama Sutta ("The Greater Discourse on the Simile of the Elephant's Footprint," MN 28)
 Maharahulovada Sutta ("The Greater Discourse of Advice to Rahula," MN 62)
 Dhatuvibhanga Sutta ("The Exposition of the Elements," MN 140)

The Four Elements are also referenced in:

 Kevaddha Sutta (DN 11)
 Mahasatipatthana Sutta (DN 22)
 Satipatthana Sutta (MN 10)
 Chabbisodhana Sutta (MN 112)
 Bahudhatuka Sutta (MN 115)
 Kayagatasati Sutta (MN 119)
 Anathapindikovada Sutta (MN 143)
 Catudhatu-vaggo (SN ch. 14, subch. IV), several discourses
 Saddhammapatirupaka Sutta (SN 16.13)
 Bija Sutta (SN 22.54)
 Asivisa Sutta (SN 35.197 or 35.238)
 Kimsuka Sutta (SN 35.204 or 35.245)
 Dutiya-mittamacca Sutta (SN 55.17)
 various brief Samyutta Nikaya discourses entitled, "Dhatu Sutta" (SN 18.9, SN 25.9, SN 26.9, SN 27.9)
 Tittha Sutta (AN 3.61)
 Nivesaka Sutta (AN 3.75)
 Rahula Sutta (AN 4.177)

In addition, the Visuddhimagga XI.27ff has an extensive discussion of the Four Elements.

See also

Classical element
Dukkha
Four Noble Truths
Khandhas
Panchatattva (Tantra)
Prakriti (Mulaprakriti) (Vedic conceptions of the basic elements of the universe)
Rupa
Samkhya (school of classical Indian philosophy, which including ether, defines Mahabhuta as 5 subtle elements)
Tanmatras
Gogyo Japanese Non-Substantial five Elements

Notes

Bibliography
 Bodhi, Bhikkhu (trans.) (2000).  The Connected Discourses of the Buddha: A Translation of the Samyutta Nikaya.  Boston: Wisdom Publications. .
 Buddhaghosa, Bhadantācariya (trans. from Pāli by Bhikkhu Ñāṇamoli) (1999). The Path of Purification: Visuddhimagga. Seattle, WA: BPS Pariyatti Editions. . 
 Hamilton, Sue (2001). Identity and Experience: The Constitution of the Human Being according to Early Buddhism. Oxford: Luzac Oriental. .
 Monier-Williams, Monier (1899, 1964). A Sanskrit-English Dictionary (London: Oxford University Press).
 , Bhikkhu (trans.) & Bodhi, Bhikkhu (ed.) (2001). The Middle-Length Discourses of the Buddha: A Translation of the Majjhima Nikāya. Boston: Wisdom Publications. .
 Nyanaponika Thera (trans.) (1981). The Greater Discourse on the Elephant-Footprint Simile. Kandy, Sri Lanka: Buddhist Publication Society.
 Olivelle, Patrick (1996). Upaniads. Oxford: Oxford University Press. .
 Rhys Davids, T.W. & William Stede (eds.) (1921–5). The Pali Text Society’s Pali–English Dictionary [PED]. Chipstead: Pali Text Society. A general on-line search engine for the PED is available from the University of Chicago's "Digital Dictionaries of South Asia" at http://dsal.uchicago.edu/dictionaries/pali/ (retrieved 2007-06-14).
 Thanissaro Bhikkhu (trans.) (1994). "SN 27.9: Dhatu Sutta – Properties" in Upakkilesa Samyutta: Defilements (SN 27.1–10). Retrieved 2008-03-17 from "Access to Insight" at http://www.accesstoinsight.org/tipitaka/sn/sn27/sn27.001-010.than.html#sn27.009.
 Thanissaro Bhikkhu (trans.) (1997a). Kayagata-sati Sutta: Mindfulness Immersed in the Body (MN 119). Retrieved 2008-03-17 from "Access to Insight" at http://www.accesstoinsight.org/tipitaka/mn/mn.119.than.html.
 Thanissaro Bhikkhu (trans.) (1997b). Kevatta (Kevaddha) Sutta: To Kevatta (DN 11). Retrieved 2008-03-17 from "Access to Insight" at http://www.accesstoinsight.org/tipitaka/dn/dn.11.0.than.html.
 Thanissaro Bhikkhu (trans.) (1997c). Dhatu-vibhanga Sutta: An Analysis of the Properties (MN 140). Retrieved 2008-03-17 from "Access to Insight" at http://www.accesstoinsight.org/tipitaka/mn/mn.140.than.html.
 Thanissaro Bhikkhu (trans.) (1998). Kimsuka Sutta: The Riddle Tree (SN 35.204). Retrieved 2008-03-17 from "Access to Insight" at http://www.accesstoinsight.org/tipitaka/sn/sn35/sn35.204.than.html.
 Thanissaro Bhikkhu (trans.) (2001). Bija Sutta: Means of Propagation (SN 22.54). Retrieved 2008-03-17 from "Access to Insight" at http://www.accesstoinsight.org/tipitaka/sn/sn22/sn22.054.than.html.
 Thanissaro Bhikkhu (trans.) (2003a). Anathapindikovada Sutta: Instructions to Anathapindika (MN 143). Retrieved 2008-03-17 from "Access to Insight" at http://www.accesstoinsight.org/tipitaka/mn/mn.143.than.html.
 Thanissaro Bhikkhu (trans.) (2003b). Maha-hatthipadopama Sutta: The Great Elephant Footprint Simile (MN 28).  Retrieved 2008-01-30 from "Access to Insight" at http://www.accesstoinsight.org/tipitaka/mn/mn.028.than.html.
 Thanissaro Bhikkhu (trans.) (2004a). Asivisa Sutta: Vipers (SN 35.197). Retrieved 2008-03-17 from "Access to Insight" at http://www.accesstoinsight.org/tipitaka/sn/sn35/sn35.197.than.html.
 Thanissaro Bhikkhu (trans.) (2004b). Dhatu Sutta: Properties (SN 25.9). Retrieved 2008-03-17 from "Access to Insight" at http://www.accesstoinsight.org/tipitaka/sn/sn25/sn25.009.than.html.
 Thanissaro Bhikkhu (trans.) (2005). Saddhammapatirupaka Sutta: A Counterfeit of the True Dhamma (SN 16.13). Retrieved 2008-03-17 from "Access to Insight" at http://www.accesstoinsight.org/tipitaka/sn/sn16/sn16.013.than.html.
 Thanissaro Bhikkhu (trans.) (2006). Maha-Rahulovada Sutta: The Greater Exhortation to Rahula (MN 62). Retrieved 2008-03-17 from "Access to Insight" at http://www.accesstoinsight.org/tipitaka/mn/mn.062.than.html.
 Walshe, Maurice O'C. (trans.) (1995). The Long Discourses of the Buddha: A Translation of the Digha Nikaya. Boston: Wisdom Publications. .

Classical elements
Hindu philosophical concepts
Buddhist philosophical concepts
God in Hinduism